ISO/TC 292 Security and resilience is a technical committee of the International Organization for Standardization formed in 2015 to develop standards in the area of security and resilience.

The Technical Management Board of ISO (TMB) decided in June 2014 to create a new ISO technical committee with the number ISO/TC 292 by merging three committees into one. The work of ISO/TC 292 officially started on 2015-01-01 and the three previous committees were dissolved and their workprogrammes moved to the new committee. ISO/TC 292 also was given the responsibility for the ISO 28000 series (Security management in the supply chain)previously developed by ISO/TC 8.

The TMB decision was made in order to clarify ISO's structural organization on security matters, and to prepare for future topics in this field by creating a de facto coordination body within the TC central structure. IT was believed that ISO/TC 292 would lead to optimization as well as limit and prevent conflict or duplication of work. It would also make it easier for public administrations/authorities with a general interest and protective mission to optimize their participation in ISO's work in this sector. As well as give Non-Profit organizations with limited resources a simplified structure to take part in.

When ISO/TC 292 was created the following three committees were merged.
 ISO/TC 223 Societal security (2001–2014)
 ISO/TC 247 Fraud countermeasures and controls (2009–2014)
 ISO/PC 284 Management system for quality of PSC operations (2013–2014)

Scope 
ISO/TC 292 works under the following scope

Standardization in the field of security to enhance the safety and resilience of society.
Excluded: Sector specific security projects developed in other relevant ISO committees and projects developed in ISO/TC 262 and ISO/PC 278.

Leadership and organization 
 Chair 2015– Mrs Åsa Kyrk Gere
 Secretary 2020- Ms Susanna Björk
 Secretary 2017–2020 Mr Bengt Rydstedt
 Secretary 2017-2017 Ms Susanna Björk
 Secretary 2015–2016 Mr Bengt Rydstedt

ISO/TC 292 currently has the following organisation.

 Working Group 1: Terminology
 Working Group 2: Continuity and organizational resilience 
 Working Group 3: Emergency management
 Working Group 4: Authenticity, integrity and trust for products and documents
 Working Group 5: Community resilience
 Working Group 6: Protective security
 Working Group 7: Guidelines for events
 Working Group 8: Supply chain security
 Working Group 9: Crisis management
 Working Group 10: Preparedness
 Joint Working Group 1: Managing emerging risk (Joint work with ISO/TC 262)
 CG: Communication Group
 DCCG: Developing Country Coordination Group

ISO/TC 292 is one of the larger committees in ISO with almost 70 member countries.

It has a wide range of experts participating in the work of ISO/TC 292, from large corporations such as Thales to start-ups such as Cypheme.

Published standards 
General
 ISO 22300:2021 Security and resilience – Vocabulary
 ISO/TS 22375:2018 Security and resilience – Guidelines for complexity assessment process
 ISO 22379:2022 Security and resilience – Guidelines for hosting and organizing large citywide and regional events
 ISO 22397:2014 Societal security – Guidelines for establishing partnering arrangements
 ISO 22398:2014 Societal security – Guidelines for exercises

Business continuity management
 ISO 22301:2019 Security and resilience – Business continuity management systems – Requirements
 ISO 22313:2020 Security and resilience – Business continuity management systems – Guidance on the use of ISO 22301
 ISO/TS 22317:2021 Security and resilience – Business continuity management systems – Guidelines for business impact analysis
 ISO/TS 22318:2021 Security and resilience – Business continuity management systems – Guidelines for supply chain continuity
 ISO/TS 22330:2018 Security and resilience – Business continuity management systems – Guidelines for people aspects on business continuity
 ISO/TS 22331:2018 Security and resilience – Business continuity management systems – Guidelines for business continuity strategy
 ISO/TS 22332:2021 Security and resilience – Business continuity management systems – Guidelines for developing business continuity plans and procedures
 ISO/IEC/TS 17021-6:2015 Conformity assessment – Requirements for bodies providing audit and certification of management systems – Part 6: Competence requirements for auditing and certification of business continuity management systems

Emergency management
 ISO 22320:2018 Security and resilience – Emergency management – Guidelines for incident management
 ISO 22322:2022 Security and resilience – Emergency management – Guidelines for public warning
 ISO 22324:2022 Security and resilience –  Emergency management – Guidelines for colour coded alert
 ISO 22325:2016 Security and resilience – Emergency management – Guidelines for capability assessment
 ISO 22326:2018 Security and resilience – Emergency management – Guidelines for monitoring facilities with identified hazards
 ISO 22327:2018 Security and resilience – Emergency management – Guidelines for implementation of a community-based landslide early warning system
 ISO 22328-1:2020 Security and resilience – Emergency management – Guidelines for implementation of a community-based natural disasters early warning system
 ISO 22328-3:2022 Security and resilience – Emergency management – Guidelines for implementation of a community-based tsunami early warning system
 ISO 22329:2021 Security and resilience – Emergency management – Guidelines for the use of social media in emergencies 
 ISO/TR 22351:2015 Societal security – Emergency management – Message structure for exchange of information

Authenticity, integrity and trust for products and documents
 ISO 22380:2018 Security and resilience – Authenticity, integrity and trust for products and documents – General principles for product fraud risk
 ISO 22381:2018 Security and resilience – Authenticity, integrity and trust for products and documents – Guidelines for interoperability of product identification and authentication systems
 ISO 22382:2018 Security and resilience – Authenticity, integrity and trust for products and documents – Guidelines for the content, security and issuance of excise tax stamps
 ISO 22383:2020 Security and resilience – Authenticity, integrity and trust for products and documents – Guidelines and performance criteria for authentication solutions for material goods 
 ISO 22384:2020 Security and resilience – Authenticity, integrity and trust for products and documents - Guidelines to establish and monitor a protection plan and its implementation 

Security management systems
 ISO 28000:2022 Security and resilience – Security management systems – Requirements
 ISO 28001:2007 Security management systems for the supply chain – Best practices for implementing supply chain security, assessments and plans – Requirements and guidance
 ISO 28002:2011 Security management systems for the supply chain – Development of resilience in the supply chain – Requirements with guidance for use
 ISO 28003:2007 Security management systems for the supply chain – Requirements for bodies providing audit and certification of supply chain security management systems
 ISO 28004-1:2007 Security management systems for the supply chain – Guidelines for the implementation of ISO 28000 Part 1: General principles
 ISO 28004-3:2014 Security management systems for the supply chain – Guidelines for the implementation of ISO 28000 Part 3: Additional specific guidance for adopting ISO 28000 for use by medium and small businesses (other than marine ports)
 ISO 28004-4:2014 Security management systems for the supply chain – Guidelines for the implementation of ISO 28000 Part 4: Additional specific guidance on implementing ISO 28000 if compliance with ISO 28001 is a management objective
 ISO 18788:2015 Management system for private security operations – Requirements with guidance for use

Community resilience
 ISO 22315:2015 Societal security – Mass evacuation – Guidelines for planning
 ISO 22319:2017 Security and resilience – Community resilience – Guidelines for planning the involvement of spontaneous volunteers
 ISO 22392:2020 Security and resilience – Community resilience – Guidelines for conducting peer reviews
 ISO/TS 22393:2021 Security and resilience – Community resilience – Guidelines for planning recovery and renewal
 ISO 22395:2018 Security and resilience – Community resilience – Guidelines for supporting vulnerable persons in an emergency
 ISO 22396:2020 Security and resilience – Community resilience – Guidelines for information exchange between organisations

Urban resilience
 ISO/TR 22370:2020 Security and resilience – Urban resilience – Framework and principles

Organizational resilience
 ISO 22316:2017 Security and resilience – Organizational resilience – Principles and attributes

Protective security
 ISO 22341:2021 Security and resilience – Protective security – Guidelines for crime prevention through environmental design

Crisis management
 ISO 22361:2022 Security and resilience – Crisis management - Guidelines

Replaced or withdrawn
 ISO 22300:2012 Societal security – Terminology (replaced by 2018 edition) 
 ISO 22300:2018 Security and resilience – Vocabulary (replaced by 2021 edition) 
 ISO 22301:2012 Societal security – Business continuity management systems – Requirements  (replaced by 2019 edition)
 ISO/TR 22312:2012 Societal security – Technological capabilities
 ISO 22313:2012 Societal security – Business continuity management systems – Guidance (replaced by 2020 edition)
 ISO 22317:2015 Societal security – Business continuity management systems – Guidelines for business impact analysis (replaced by 2021 edition)
 ISO 22318:2015 Societal security – Business continuity management systems – Guidelines for supply chain continuity (replaced by 2021 edition)
 ISO 22320:2011 Societal security – Emergency management – Requirements for incident response (replaced by 2018 edition)
 ISO 22322:2015 Societal security – Emergency management – Guidelines for public warning (replaced by 2022 edition)
 ISO 22324:2015 Societal security – Emergency management – Guidelines for colour coded alert (replaced by 2022 edition)
 ISO/PAS 22399:2007 Societal security – Guideline for incident preparedness and operational continuity management (replaced by ISO 22301 and ISO 22313)
 ISO 12931:2012 Performance criteria for authentication solutions used to combat counterfeiting of material goods
 ISO 16678:2014 Guidelines for interoperable object identification and related authentication systems to deter counterfeiting and illicit trade
 ISO 28000:2007 Specification for security management systems for the supply chain

References

External links
 www.iso.org
 www.isotc292online.org

ISO standards
ISO technical committees